Becht is a German surname. Notable people with this surname include:

 Alexander Becht (born 1986), German actor
 Anthony Becht (born 1977), American football player
 Bart Becht (born 1956), Dutch businessman
 Friederike Becht (born 1986), German actress
 Hermann Becht (1939–2009), German operatic bass-baritone
 John Becht (born 1886), American cyclist
 Olivier Becht (born 1976), French politician